Sprinkle may refer to:

 Sprinkles, a decorative candy used on cakes and cupcakes

People
Aaron Sprinkle (born c. 1970s), American musician and producer
Annie Sprinkle (born 1954), American actor and educator
Ed Sprinkle (born 1923), American football player
Hugh Sprinkle (1896-1961), American football player
Jesse Sprinkle (born 1976), American musician
Jeremy Sprinkle (born 1994), American football player

Other uses
 Sprinkle Spangles, a brand of breakfast cereal
 Aspersion, a method of baptism, particularly used for infants and children